This is a conversion chart showing how the Dewey Decimal and Library of Congress Classification systems organize resources by concept, in part for the purpose of assigning call numbers.  These two systems account for over 95% of the classification in United States libraries, and are used widely around the world.

The chart includes all ninety-nine second level (two-digit) DDC classes (040 is not assigned), and should include all second level (two-digit) LCC classes. Where a class in one system maps to several classes in other system, it will be listed multiple times (e.g. DDC class 551).

Additional information on these classification plans is available at:
 Dewey Decimal Classification—high level categories, with links to lower level categories
 Library of Congress Classification—high level categories

Chart

See also
 Books in the United States

References
 Map Dewey Decimal vs. Library of Congress
 Map Library of Congress vs. Dewey Decimal
 Library of Congress Classification Outline
 Cataloging Distribution Service – Source of Library of Congress Classification schedules
 Library of Congress Classification Outline – Class A (PDF)
 Library of Congress Classification Outline – Class B (PDF)
 Library of Congress Classification Outline – Class C (PDF)
 Library of Congress Classification Outline – Class D (PDF)
 Library of Congress Classification Outline – Classes E and F (PDF)
 Library of Congress Classification Outline – Class G (PDF)
 Library of Congress Classification Outline – Class H (PDF)
 Library of Congress Classification Outline – Class J (PDF)
 Library of Congress Classification Outline – Class K (PDF)
 Library of Congress Classification Outline – Class L (PDF)
 Library of Congress Classification Outline – Class M (PDF)
 Library of Congress Classification Outline – Class N (PDF)
 Library of Congress Classification Outline – Class P (PDF)
 Library of Congress Classification Outline – Class Q (PDF)
 Library of Congress Classification Outline – Class R (PDF)
 Library of Congress Classification Outline – Class S (PDF)
 Library of Congress Classification Outline – Class T (PDF)
 Library of Congress Classification Outline – Class U (PDF)
 Library of Congress Classification Outline – Class V (PDF)
 Library of Congress Classification Outline – Class Z (PDF)
 Library of Congress Subject Classifications in the Mathematics Statistics Library (University of California, Berkeley)

Comparisons
 
Dewey Decimal Classification